is an urban expressway in Nagoya, Japan. It is a part of the Nagoya Expressway network and is owned and operated by Nagoya Expressway Public Corporation.

Overview

The first section was opened to traffic in 1988 and the entire route was completed in 2003. The expressway is 4 lanes for its entire length.

The route runs from west to east through the center of the city of Nagoya. It begins at Shinsuzaki Junction where it meets the Ring Route and Route 5. Route 2 then bisects the Ring Route, meets it once again at Marutamachi Junction, and continues eastward. The route eventually terminates at a junction with the Higashi-Meihan Expressway.

Originally it was planned that Route 2 would connect to the Higashi-Meihan at Kamiyashiro Junction which connects directly to the Tōmei Expressway. However, local opposition led to the route being moved a short distance south to Takabari Junction. This forces users to pay a relatively expensive toll to access the Tōmei by way of the Higashi-Meihan (500 yen for 2.7 km). A description of the planning of Route 2 can be found here.

In order to combat congestion on the Ring Route, a plan to divert traffic to Route 2 and local roads has been implemented. Vehicles using Electronic Toll Collection (ETC) are permitted use the exit at Fukiage-higashi Interchange and use local roads to reach the entrance of the same interchange without incurring an additional toll, provided exit and re-entry occurs within 15 minutes. Diagrams explaining how to take advantage of the plan can be found here.

Interchange list

 JCT - junction, TB - toll gate

References

External links
 Nagoya Expressway Public Corporation

Nagoya Expressway